Christian Schreier (born 4 February 1959) is a German former professional footballer who is the general manager of SC Paderborn. He played as an midfielder, most notably with VfL Bochum and Bayer Leverkusen, and won one cap for West Germany, in 1984. His biggest successes came in 1988, when he won the UEFA Cup and an Olympic bronze Medal.

References

External links
 
 
 

1959 births
Living people
People from Castrop-Rauxel
Sportspeople from Münster (region)
German footballers
Germany international footballers
Germany B international footballers
Association football midfielders
Association football forwards
Bundesliga players
2. Bundesliga players
VfL Bochum players
Bayer 04 Leverkusen players
Fortuna Düsseldorf players
Rot-Weiss Essen players
SC Paderborn 07 players
FC Wegberg-Beeck players
Olympic footballers of West Germany
West German footballers
Footballers at the 1984 Summer Olympics
Footballers at the 1988 Summer Olympics
Olympic bronze medalists for West Germany
German football managers
1. FC Union Berlin managers
Olympic medalists in football
UEFA Cup winning players
Medalists at the 1988 Summer Olympics
Footballers from North Rhine-Westphalia